Vincent Dumisani Ngobe (born 5 March 1973) is a South African former professional soccer player who played as a midfielder. He played 32 times for the South Africa national team and works currently as head of development for Mpumalanga Black Aces.

Ngobe earned 32 caps and scored 2 goals for South Africa national football team, being selected for 1997 FIFA Confederations Cup, 1998 and 2000 Africa Cup of Nations and 2000 Summer Olympics, the latter as an overaged player.

External links
 

1973 births
Living people
People from Witbank
Sportspeople from Mpumalanga
South African soccer players
South Africa international soccer players
South African expatriate soccer players
Maritzburg United F.C. players
Moroka Swallows F.C. players
Kaizer Chiefs F.C. players
Orlando Pirates F.C. players
1997 FIFA Confederations Cup players
1998 African Cup of Nations players
2000 African Cup of Nations players
Footballers at the 2000 Summer Olympics
Olympic soccer players of South Africa
Expatriate footballers in Malaysia
MKE Ankaragücü footballers
Akçaabat Sebatspor footballers
Gençlerbirliği S.K. footballers
Expatriate footballers in Turkey
South African expatriate sportspeople in Turkey
South African expatriate sportspeople in Malaysia
Expatriate footballers in Vietnam
Sabah F.C. (Malaysia) players
Süper Lig players
Association football midfielders